The Jakarta Project created and maintained open source software for the Java platform. It operated as an umbrella project under the auspices of the Apache Software Foundation, and all Jakarta products are released under the Apache License. As of December 21, 2011 the Jakarta project was retired because no subprojects were remaining.

In 2018 Jakarta EE, a part of the Eclipse Enterprise for Java (EE4J) project, became the new name for the Java EE platform at the Eclipse Foundation.

Subprojects
Major contributions by the Jakarta Project include tools, libraries and frameworks such as:

BCEL - a Java byte code manipulation library
BSF - a scripting framework
Cactus - a unit testing framework for server-side Java classes
Apache JMeter - a load- and stress-testing tool.

The following projects were formerly part of Jakarta, but now form independent projects within the Apache Software Foundation:

Ant - a build tool
Commons - a collection of useful classes intended to complement Java's standard library.
HiveMind - a services and configuration microkernel
Maven - a project build and management tool 
POI - a pure Java port of Microsoft's popular file formats.
Struts - a web application development framework
Slide - a content repository primarily using WebDAV.
Tapestry - A component object model based on JavaBeans properties and strong specifications
Tomcat - a JSP/Servlet container
Turbine - a rapid development web application framework
Velocity - a template engine

Project name

Jakarta is named after the conference room at Sun Microsystems where the majority of discussions leading to the project's creation took place. At the time, Sun's Java software division was headquartered in a Cupertino building where the conference room names were all coffee references.

References

External links

The Jakarta home page

Java platform
Apache Software Foundation